Closterovirus, also known as beet yellows viral group, is a genus of viruses, in the family Closteroviridae. Plants serve as natural hosts. There are 17 species in this genus. Diseases associated with this genus include: yellowing and necrosis, particularly affecting the phloem. This genus has a probably worldwide distribution and includes among other viral species the Beet yellows virus (the type species) and Citrus tristeza virus, rather economically important plant diseases. At least some species require vectors such as aphids or mealybugs for their transmission from plant to plant.

Taxonomy
The following species are assigned to the genus:
 Arracacha virus 1
 Beet yellow stunt virus
 Beet yellows virus
 Blackcurrant closterovirus 1
 Burdock yellows virus
 Carnation necrotic fleck virus
 Carrot closterovirus 1
 Carrot yellow leaf virus
 Citrus tristeza virus
 Grapevine leafroll-associated virus 2
 Mint virus 1
 Raspberry leaf mottle virus
 Rehmannia virus 1
 Rose leaf rosette-associated virus
 Strawberry chlorotic fleck-associated virus
 Tobacco virus 1
 Wheat yellow leaf virus

RNA pseudoknot
The viral RNA molecules of some members of this genus contain four hair-pin structures and a pseudoknot in the 3'UTR. These secondary structures have been found to be important in viral RNA replication.

Life cycle
Viral replication is cytoplasmic. Entry into the host cell is achieved by penetration into the host cell. Replication follows the positive stranded RNA virus replication model. Positive stranded rna virus transcription is the method of transcription. The virus exits the host cell by tubule-guided viral movement.
Plants serve as the natural host. Transmission routes are mechanical.

Structure
Viruses in Closterovirus are non-enveloped, with flexuous and filamentous geometries. The diameter is around 10-13 nm, with a length of 1250-2200 nm. Genomes are linear, around 19.3kb in length.

References

External links
 ICTV Report: Closteroviridea
 Viralzone: Closterovirus
 

Closteroviridae
Viral plant pathogens and diseases
Virus genera